The Cork county camogie team represents Cork in camogie. The team competes at inter-county level.

Cork camogie has experienced four periods of ascendancy in the All-Ireland Senior Camogie Championship, winning 24 titles in all. The team won six championships in an eight-year period, 1934-6 and 1939–41, won four-in-a-row 1970-4, won three titles in a five-year period 1978-83, five titles in a seven-year period 1992-8, and six more titles since 2002. The team also dominated the National Camogie League despite taking nine years to win their first title in 1984, winning seven-in-a-row 1995-2001 and ten titles in 13 years 1991-2003. Cork is the leading team at under-16 level, with 13 successes.

Titles
 All-Ireland Senior Camogie Championships: 24
 1939, 1940, 1941, 1970, 1971, 1972, 1973, 1978, 1980, 1982, 1983, 1992, 1993, 1995, 1997, 1998, 2002, 2005, 2006, 2008, 2009, 2014, 2015, 2017, 2018
 National Camogie Leagues: 15
 1984, 1986, 1991, 1992, 1995, 1996, 1997, 1998, 1999, 2000, 2001, 2003, 2006, 2007, 2012

See also
Camogie in County Cork

References